CHH may refer to:
Chachapoyas Airport
Hainan Airlines
Cabell Huntington Hospital, Huntington, West Virginia
 Cartilage–hair hypoplasia
 Cheswick and Harmar Railroad, a 20th-century defunct railroad in Pennsylvania
 Choi Hung station, Hong Kong; MTR station code CHH
 Chh (trigraph), a trigraph used in romanizations of Indic languages
 Christian hip hop